Willem Hendrik Jacques "Sheep" du Plessis (born 12 August 1993) is a South African rugby union player. His regular playing positions are flanker or lock.

Career

Youth

His performance in the latter tournament led to his selection in the 2011 South African Schools squad.

Blue Bulls

In July 2013, the Blue Bulls announced that he signed a contract extension until 31 October 2015.

Bulls

Montpellier
Shortly before the 2015 Super Rugby season, the  announced that Du Plessis would leave after the 2015 Currie Cup Premier Division to take up a two-year contract with French Top 14 side .

Return to the Bulls

On 12 April 2021, Du Plessis has left Montpellier early to return to South Africa with the Bulls.

Representative rugby

Du Plessis was included the South Africa Under-20 squad for the 2013 IRB Junior World Championship.

In May 2014, Du Plessis was one of eight uncapped players that were called up to a Springbok training camp prior to the 2014 mid-year rugby union tests.

Varsity Cup

Honours
 2015–16 European Rugby Challenge Cup : winner.
 Currie Cup winner (2021)

References

1993 births
Living people
People from uPhongolo Local Municipality
Afrikaner people
South African rugby union players
South African expatriates in France
Expatriate rugby union players in France
Blue Bulls players
Bulls (rugby union) players
Rugby union flankers
South Africa Under-20 international rugby union players
South African male discus throwers
Athletes (track and field) at the 2010 Summer Youth Olympics
Youth Olympic gold medalists for South Africa
Youth Olympic gold medalists in athletics (track and field)
Montpellier Hérault Rugby players
Rugby union players from KwaZulu-Natal